Pacific Palisades may refer to:

 Pacific Palisades, Los Angeles, California, a neighborhood located in the Westside of Los Angeles
 Pacific Palisades (TV series), 1997 Aaron Spelling production set in Pacific Palisades, Los Angeles
 Pacific Palisades (film), 1990 French-American comedy film set in Pacific Palisades, Los Angeles
 Pacific Palisades Conservation Area, a region of sandstone cliffs near Pacific, Missouri
 A suburban neighborhood located in Pearl City on the island of Oʻahu in Hawaiʻi